Permanent TSB Group Holdings plc, formerly Irish Life and Permanent plc is a provider of personal financial services in Ireland. Irish Life Assurance plc and the Irish Permanent Building Society merged to form the Irish Life and Permanent Group in 1999 and the merged entity acquired the Trustee Savings Bank in 2001. The group has no connection to the UK's TSB Bank.

History
The bank is historically derived from three different companies:
 Irish Life Assurance
 Irish Permanent Building Society 
 Trustee Savings Bank (no relation to the British bank of the same name)

Irish Life Assurance plc (founded 1939) and the Irish Permanent Building Society (founded 1884) merged to form the Irish Life and Permanent Group in 1999 and the merged entity acquired the Trustee Savings Bank (founded 1816) in 2001.

Irish Life Assurance
Irish Life was a life assurance company created in 1939 with state assistance and concentrated on life assurance and investment products.

 The City of Dublin Assurance Company, Limited;
 the Irish Life and General Assurance Company, Limited;
 the Irish National Assurance Company, Limited; and
 the Munster and Leinster Assurance Company, Limited
were amalgamated.

Later some British companies shed their Irish operations, and merged them into this new company. They were:

 the Prudential,
 the Britannic,
 the Liverpool Victoria Friendly Society,
 the Pearl, and
 the Refuge.

Shares in the business were sold to the public in July 1991. In 1965 Irish Life entered the UK market and competed against its former parent, initially under its own name.

In 1999, Irish Life Assurance plc and the Irish Permanent Building Society merged to form the Irish Life and Permanent Group. In March 2012, Irish Life Assurance was sold to the Irish State for €1.3 billion as part of a bank recapitalisation programme following the Irish financial crisis.

Irish Permanent Building Society
Permanent TSB, previously the Irish Permanent Building Society, was founded as The Irish Temperance Permanent Benefit Building Society which was founded in 1884. In 1940 under new managing director Edmund Farrell its name was changed to Irish Permanent Building Society. Farrell, and later his son, Edmund Farrell Jnr managed the building society until about 1990.

In 1992 Irish Permanent Finance, specialising in auto finance, was established.

In 1992 branch operations were opened in London and Belfast.

In 1992 a Banking subsidiary established in the Isle of Man.

In 1994 the Irish private banking operation of Guinness & Mahon was acquired.

In 1996 Capital Home Loans, a UK mortgage lender, was acquired.

It was a mutual organisation, jointly owned by those saving and borrowing. It demutualised to form a plc on 21 September 1994. Irish Permanent was a predominantly personal banking and mortgage company and in 2001 acquired the Irish Trustee Savings Bank from the Government of Ireland.

Trustee Savings Bank
The origins of the TSB Bank date back to 1816 when the first Irish Savings Bank was established in Waterford. Shortly afterwards, savings banks were established in Cork, Dublin, Monaghan and Limerick.

The Dublin and Monaghan banks merged in 1977, followed by the amalgamation of the Cork and Limerick banks in 1986.

In 1988, Waterford was incorporated into the Dublin bank and finally, in 1992, Cork and Limerick Savings Bank amalgamated with Trustee Savings Bank Dublin, to form TSB Bank. It was purchased by Irish Life and Permanent from the Government of Ireland in 2001.

Recent history
During the Irish banking crisis the group was split. The profitable Irish Life Group was purchased by the government for €1.3 billion, and subsequently sold to Great-west Lifeco in July 2013. The bank received a further €2.7 billion of capital from the Irish State, bringing it into majority state ownership.

The bank has over one million customers in Ireland. The chief executive of Permanent TSB is Eamonn Crowley, who succeeded Jeremy Masding in that capacity in June 2020.

In March 2011 during the Irish banking crisis the bank was said to be in need of an external €4.0 billion bailout.

In February 2011 SEB (Skandinaviska Enskilda Banken AB) acquired Irish Life International Ltd (ILI), so it now operates under the corporate name Life International Assurance Company Limited.

On 19 February 2013, Great-West Lifeco of Canada announced its acquisition of the Irish Life Group for €1.3 billion.  This was disputed by the shareholders. The Supreme Court gave its judgement on 9 July 2013, rejecting the shareholders' application to delay the sale, pending the hearing of their challenge of the sale.  This was heard on 21 January 2014,  and concluded on 13 February 2014. Judgement was reserved and on 15 August 2014 the case was referred to Europe.

In October 2016, the US bank Cerberus Capital Management bought the UK loan book.

In July 2022, Permanent TSB received approval to acquire a €7.6 billion Ulster Bank loan book by the Competition and Consumer Protection Commission (CCPC), along with 25 branch properties. Former competitor, Ulster Bank had announced its withdrawal of services from the Republic of Ireland in February 2021.

See also

 List of Irish companies

External links
 Official website of the group
 Permanent TSB official website

References

Banks of Ireland
Financial services companies based in Dublin (city)
Companies listed on Euronext Dublin
Former state-sponsored bodies of the Republic of Ireland
1884 establishments in Ireland
Financial services companies established in 1884
Irish brands